Wisarut Waingan is a Thai professional footballer who plays as a defender for Thai League 2 club Suphanburi.

References

External links
Players Profile - Thaisoccernet
Visarut Vaigan

Living people
1991 births
Wisarut Waingan
Wisarut Waingan
Wisarut Waingan
Wisarut Waingan
Wisarut Waingan
Wisarut Waingan
Wisarut Waingan
Wisarut Waingan
Wisarut Waingan
Wisarut Waingan
Association football defenders